Lossémy Karaboué (born 18 March 1988) is a Ivorian footballer who currently plays for PT Prachuap in the Thai League 1 as a midfielder. He has been called up to the Ivory Coast national football team but has never appeared for the team.

Club career
Karaboué began his career in the youth academy of Olympique Lyonnais. He primarily played with Lyon's CFA squad. After the 2007–08 season, he moved to the Ardennes-based side CS Sedan. He made his professional football debut on 29 August 2008 in a Ligue 2 match against Guingamp coming on as a substitute playing 35 minutes; the match ended in a 1–1 draw. He went on to start the following five matches before being relegated back to the bench as an occasional sub.

Having agreed to a termination of his Troyes contract, Karaboué was linked with Turkish side Kayserispor.

References

External links
 
 

1988 births
Living people
Footballers from Paris
Ivorian footballers
French footballers
French sportspeople of Ivorian descent
French sportspeople of Burkinabé descent
Sportspeople of Burkinabé descent
Association football midfielders
Olympique Lyonnais players
CS Sedan Ardennes players
AS Nancy Lorraine players
ES Troyes AC players
Levadiakos F.C. players
Valenciennes FC players
FC Botoșani players
Lossemy Karaboue
Ligue 1 players
Ligue 2 players
Liga I players
Lossemy Karaboue
Ivorian expatriate footballers
Ivorian expatriate sportspeople in Greece
Expatriate footballers in Greece
Ivorian expatriate sportspeople in Romania
Expatriate footballers in Romania